Robert Fortier (November 5, 1926 – January 1, 2005) was an American film, television and theatre actor. He was known for playing Scotty in the American adventure television series The Troubleshooters.

Life and career 
Fortier was born in West Hollywood, California. He was originally a member of the New York City Ballet and found his training as a dancer useful in working as a stuntman. Fortier began his screen career in 1950 with an uncredited role in the film Let's Dance. He then appeared in the 1951 films Texas Carnival and Show Boat. His theatre credits include Broadway productions of Pal Joey and Me and Juliet. In 1959, he played Scotty in the new NBC adventure television series The Troubleshooters, which starred Keenan Wynn and Bob Mathias.

Fortier then starred in the television soap opera Full Circle, playing Gary Donovan. He guest-starred in television programs including Gunsmoke, Bonanza, The Fugitive, The Law and Mr. Jones, The Life and Legend of Wyatt Earp, Outlaws, The Millionaire, Colt .45 and Star Trek: The Original Series. Fortier played Capt. Jampel in the drama television series Combat!. In his film career, he played the role of the town drunk "Bill Barnacle" in the 1980 film Popeye. Fortier appeared in films such as A Wedding, McCabe & Mrs. Miller, 3 Women and Heaven Can Wait. His last credit was from 1987 film O.C. and Stiggs.

Death 
Fortier died in January 2005 in Orange, California, at the age of 78.

References

External links 

Rotten Tomatoes profile

1926 births
2005 deaths
People from West Hollywood, California
Male actors from California
American male film actors
American male stage actors
American male television actors
American male soap opera actors
20th-century American male actors